is a mountain located in Himeji, Hyōgo. It is part of the Seiban Kyūryō Prefectural Natural Park, and is designated as a wildlife sanctuary (special protection area) in Hyōgo Prefecture, as well as being selected as one of the 100 Hyogo Forests and 50 Furusato Hyogo Mountains.

References 

Shosha